Northern Southland College (NSC) is a secondary school for students from year 7 to 13 in Lumsden, New Zealand. 

NCS has students from  Mossburn, Balfour and Five Rivers. Most pupils travel to school via bus.

Notes

Secondary schools in Southland, New Zealand